The Get Set is a Los Angeles, California rock/alt-pop band.

Biography
Formed in 2001, Los Angeles-based The Get Set features Rob Goraieb and Mark Powell who were previously in the band Kosmos Express.

The Get Set's debut Down Marriott Lane! (released early 2002) featured the song "Best Friend (I Was About To Be)" and was produced by Rob Laufer.

Band members
Rob Goraieb:  Lead Vocals, Guitar, Songwriter
Mark Powell:  Drumset, Background Vocals
Chris Diede: Wurlitzer/Piano, Background Vocals
Gerry Valvona: Bass

Former Band Members
Mark Eastwood: Bass

Discography
Down Marriott Lane! (U.S. release 2002)
Down Marriott Lane! (Japanese release with bonus tracks 2004)

Compilations
You Can't Be Neutral On A Moving Train: Songs For Election Day (Label: Selector Series 2008 feat. Bono with the Soweto Gospel Choir and Dave Stewart - Track 7: The Get Set's "Make It Happen")

T.V. Shows/Soundtracks
The Get Set were featured in the hit T.V. show DVD Roswell (WB/UPN):

"Big Nothing" was in Season One: Episode 1.15 Independence Day. Scene: At Crashdown, Isabel, Liz and Maria talk about Michael; Max comes and tells them Valenti's got him.

"I Feel Free" was in Season One: Episode 1.20 Max to the Max. Scene: In Crashdown kitchen, Maria overhears Michael and Isabel talking about baby.

External links
 Beyond Mainstream Down Marriott Lane! review

Note: Material compiled via band's record labels, magazines, news reports, and artist's website.

Get Set, The